Keiron O'Loughlin is an English former professional rugby league footballer who played for Wigan, Workington Town, Widnes, Salford and Leigh. He is the father of England and Great Britain international Sean O'Loughlin and grandfather of England rugby union player Owen Farrell.

Background
Keiron O'Loughlin was born in Wigan, Lancashire, England.

Playing career

County honours
Keiron O'Loughlin represented Lancashire five times between 1971 and 1985.

Challenge Cup Final appearances
Keiron O'Loughlin played right-, i.e. number 3, in Widnes 14-14 draw with Hull F.C. in the 1982 Challenge Cup Final during the 1981–82 season at Wembley Stadium, London on Saturday 1 May 1982, in front of a crowd of 92,147, played right-, i.e. number 3, in the 9-18 defeat by Hull F.C. in the 1982 Challenge Cup Final replay during the 1981–82 season at Elland Road, Leeds on Wednesday 19 May 1982, in front of a crowd of 41,171, and played  in the 19-6 victory over Wigan in the 1984 Challenge Cup Final during the 1983–84 season at Wembley Stadium, London on Saturday 5 May 1984, in front of a crowd of 80,116.

County Cup Final appearances
Keiron O'Loughlin played left-, i.e. number 4, and scored 2-tries in Wigan's 19-9 victory over Salford in the 1973 Lancashire County Cup Final during the 1973–74 season at Wilderspool Stadium, Warrington on Saturday 13 October 1973, and played left-, i.e. number 4, in Widnes' 8-12 defeat by Barrow in the 1983 Lancashire County Cup Final during the 1983–84 season at Central Park, Wigan on Saturday 1 October 1983.

John Player Special Trophy Final appearances
Keiron O'Loughlin played right-, i.e. number 3, in Widnes' 10-18 defeat by Leeds in the 1983–84 John Player Special Trophy Final during the 1983–84 season at Central Park, Wigan on Saturday 14 January 1984.

Genealogical information
Keiron O'Loughlin is the father of the rugby league footballer, Sean O'Loughlin, the brother of the rugby league , or  who played in the 1960s, 1970s and 1980s for Wigan, Swinton and Blackpool Borough, Kevin O'Loughlin, and the grandfather of the rugby union footballer Owen Farrell.

References

External links
 Statistics at rugbyleagueproject.org

English rugby league players
Farrell family
Lancashire rugby league team players
Leigh Leopards players
Rugby league centres
Rugby league five-eighths
Rugby league players from Wigan
Rugby league wingers
Salford Red Devils players
Widnes Vikings players
Wigan Warriors players
Workington Town players
Year of birth missing (living people)
Living people
English people of Irish descent